Andrew Kelly (born 8 March 1988) is a New Zealand international lawn and indoor bowler.

Early life
He grew up in Oamaru, North Otago and was a pupil at Waitaki Boys' High School.

Bowls career
In 2009, he won the Hong Kong International Bowls Classic pairs title with Richard Collett. He was a World Junior champion (2010) and he captained the fours (outdoors) when winning the New Zealand National Bowls Championships in 2012 and 2014, when bowling for the Canterbury 2017 and Redcliffs Bowls Clubs respectively.

He won double gold at the 2015 Asia Pacific Bowls Championships in Christchurch.

In 2018, he qualified for the 2018 World Indoor Bowls Championship where he eliminated six times world champion Alex Marshall. In 2020 he won the singles title at the National Championships. In 2020, he was selected for the 2020 World Outdoor Bowls Championship in Australia and during the same year won the national singles. In 2022, he won his fourth national title after winning the pairs.

In 2022, he competed in the men's triples and the men's fours at the 2022 Commonwealth Games.

References

External links
 
 

1988 births
Living people
New Zealand male bowls players
Bowls players at the 2022 Commonwealth Games
People educated at Waitaki Boys' High School
20th-century New Zealand people
21st-century New Zealand people